Yvan Goor (30 November 1884 – 20 March 1958), sometimes written as Ivan Goor, was a Belgian cyclist and motorcyclist.

Career

Cycling 
Yvan Goor began cycling with the support of his father, who acted as his manager and coach. Goor focused on motor-paced racing and his father acted as his pacemaker. In 1906, whilst racing at Magdeburg, Goor's father fell heavily and was unable to compete for the rest of the season.

Twice, in 1910 and 1911, Goor was Belgian champion in motor-paced racing and in 1908, 1912 and 1914 he came second. In 1921, Goor ended his career as a professional cyclist as he was unable to compete at the same level as before the war. As a member of the "RC Pesant Club Liégois", he created a relief fund for cyclists.

Motorcycle racing 
In 1924, at the age of 40, Goor took up motorcycle racing. Twice he was European champion in the 175 cc category, in 1930 and 1934 whilst riding a DKW and Benelli respectively. In 1931 he came second in the European Championship to Eric Fernihough in the 175 cc category.

Major wins

Cycling 
 1910 Belgian motor-paced racing champion
 1911 Belgian motor-paced racing champion

Motorcycle racing 
 1930 – 175 cc European champion
 1934 – 175 cc European champion

References

Books

Websites

Footnotes 

1884 births
1958 deaths
Belgian male cyclists
Belgian motorcycle racers
People from Verviers
Cyclists from Liège Province